The following lists events that happened during 1959 in the Colony of Southern Rhodesia.

Incumbents
 Prime Minister: Humphrey Gibbs (starting 28 December)

Events
 Kariba Dam's 128 m high and 579 m long concrete wall is finished.

Births
 Berenice Josephine Bickle, artist, is born Bulawayo
 4 June - Russell Tiffin, international cricket umpire,  is born in Salisbury
 7 August - Ali Shah, all-rounder cricketer, is born in Salisbury

 
Years of the 20th century in Southern Rhodesia
1950s in Southern Rhodesia
Southern Rhodesia
Southern Rhodesia